USDM may refer to:
United States Death Metal
United States domestic market
Sammarinese Union of Moderates